The 2019 Music City Bowl was a college football bowl game played on December 30, 2019, with kickoff at 4:00 p.m. EST (3:00 p.m. local CDT) on ESPN. The 22nd edition of the Music City Bowl featured Southeastern Conference member Mississippi State and Atlantic Coast Conference member Louisville, and was one of the 2019–20 bowl games concluding the 2019 FBS football season. Sponsored by the Franklin American Mortgage Company, the game was officially known as the Franklin American Mortgage Music City Bowl.

Teams
The 2019 Music City Bowl was contested by the Mississippi State Bulldogs and the Louisville Cardinals. The teams had met five times previously, with Mississippi State holding a 3–2 edge in the series. Louisville's two wins came via forfeit, as the Bulldogs were forced to forfeit all their wins in 1975 and 1976 for fielding a player who was later ruled ineligible. The teams had last met in the 2017 TaxSlayer Bowl, won by the Bulldogs, 31–27.

Mississippi State Bulldogs

The Bulldogs entered the bowl with a 6–6 record (3–5 in conference); they finished in fifth place of the SEC's West Division. This was Mississippi State's second Music City Bowl; their 2011 team won that season's Music City Bowl over Wake Forest, 23–17. This was the 10th consecutive bowl appearance for the Bulldogs, dating back to their 2010 season. This was Mississippi State's 23rd overall bowl game in program history.

Head coach Joe Moorhead had initially named true freshman Garrett Shrader the starting quarterback for the game, but he was injured prior to the game, resulting in Tommy Stevens (a graduate transfer from Penn State) getting the start.

Louisville Cardinals

Louisville entered the bowl with a 7–5 record (5–3 in conference), including an upset win against No. 19 Wake Forest by three points on October 12. The Cardinals finished in second place in the ACC's Atlantic Division. This was Louisville's second Music City Bowl; their 2015 team won that season's Music City Bowl over Texas A&M, 27–21. This was the first bowl game for the Cardinals since 2017, and the 23rd overall bowl game for the program.

Game summary

Statistics

References

External links

Game statistics at statbroadcast.com

Music City Bowl
Music City Bowl
Music City Bowl
Music City Bowl
Mississippi State Bulldogs football bowl games
Louisville Cardinals football bowl games